81st Division or 81st Infantry Division may refer to:

 Infantry divisions 
 81st (West Africa) Division (United Kingdom) 
 81st Division (People's Republic of China)
 81st Reserve Division (German Empire) 
 81st Division (Imperial Japanese Army)
 81st Infantry Division (United States) 
 81st Rifle Division (Soviet Union)
 81st Guards Motor Rifle Division (Soviet Union)

See also
 81st Brigade (disambiguation)
 81st Regiment (disambiguation)
 81st Squadron (disambiguation)